Mardi Gras Indians (also known as Black Masking Indians) are black carnival revelers in New Orleans, Louisiana, who dress up for Mardi Gras in suits influenced by Native American ceremonial apparel.

Collectively, their organizations are called "tribes". There are about 38 tribes which range in size from half a dozen to several dozen members. The groups are largely independent, but a pair of umbrella organizations loosely coordinates the Uptown Indians and the Downtown Indians.

In addition to Mardi Gras Day, many of the tribes also parade on Saint Joseph's Day (March 19) and the Sunday nearest to Saint Joseph's Day ("Super Sunday"). Traditionally, these were the only times Mardi Gras Indians were seen in public in full regalia. The New Orleans Jazz & Heritage Festival began the practice of hiring tribes to appear at the Festival as well. In recent years it has become more common to see Mardi Gras Indians at other festivals and parades in the city.

Notwithstanding the popularity of such activities for tourists and residents alike, the phenomenon of the Mardi Gras Indians is said to reflect both a vital musical history and an equally vital attempt to express internal social dynamics.

History

Mardi Gras Indians have been practicing their traditions in New Orleans at least since the mid-19th century, possibly before. The history of the Mardi Gras Indians is shrouded in mystery and folklore.

Congo Square

In 1740, New Orleans' Congo Square was a cultural center for African music and dance.  New Orleans was more liberal than many Southern cities, and on Sundays African slaves gathered to sing folk songs, play traditional music, and dance.  The lively parties were recounted by a Northern observer as being "indescribable... Never will you see gayer countenances, demonstrations of more forgetfulness of the past and the future, and more entire abandonment to the joyous existence to the present moment."  The idea of letting loose and embracing traditional African music and dance is a backbone of the Mardi Gras Indians practice.

Native American and African American encounters
As a major southern trade port, New Orleans became a cultural melting pot.

During the late 1740s and 1750s, many enslaved Africans fled to the bayous of Louisiana where they encountered Native Americans.  Years later, after the Civil War, hundreds of freed slaves joined the U.S. Ninth Cavalry Regiment, also known as Buffalo Soldiers.  The Buffalo Soldiers fought, killed, forced, and aided the mass removal and relocation of the Plains Indians on the Western Frontier.  After returning to New Orleans, many ex-soldiers joined popular Wild West shows, most notably Buffalo Bill's Wild West. The show wintered in New Orleans from 1884 to 1885 and was hailed by the Daily Picayune as "the people's choice". There was at least one black cowboy in the show, and there were numerous black cowhands.

On Mardi Gras in 1885, 50 to 60 Plains Indians marched in native dress on the streets of New Orleans.  Later that year, it is believed the first Mardi Gras Indian gang was formed; the tribe was named "The Creole Wild West" and was most likely composed of members of Buffalo Bill's Wild West show. However, the "Indian gangs" might predate their appearance in the City. A source from 1849 refers to black performers on Congo Square fully covered in "the plumes of the peacock.” 

The origins of the Mardi Gras Indians have also been traced to mock-war performances by warriors from the Kingdom of Kongo.

Suits
Mardi Gras Indian suits cost thousands of dollars in materials alone and can weigh upwards of one hundred pounds.  A suit usually takes between six and nine months to plan and complete.  Each Indian designs and creates his own suit; elaborate bead patches depict meaningful and symbolic scenes.  Beads, feathers, and sequins are integral parts of a Mardi Gras Indian suit.  Uptown New Orleans tribes tend to have more sculptural and abstract African-inspired suits; downtown tribes have more pictorial suits with heavy Native American influences.

The suits are revealed on Super Sunday and rival professional costume designers. Even though men dominate the different tribes, women can become Mardi Gras Indian "Queens" who make their own costumes and masks. The suits incorporate volume, giving the clothing a sculptural sensibility. Darryl Montana, son of the Big Chief of the Yellow Pocahontas "Hunters" tribe, states that the suits each year cost around $5,000 in materials that can include up to 300 yards of down feather trimming. The suits can take up to a year to complete as each artist needs to order materials, design the layout, sew and bead. The beadwork is entirely done by hand and feature a combination of color and texture. Some of the suits are displayed in museums throughout the country.

Parade formation and protocol

The Mardi Gras Indians play various traditional roles.  Many blocks ahead of the Indians are plain clothed informants keeping an eye out for any danger.  The procession begins with "spyboys," dressed in light "running suits" that allow them the freedom to move quickly in case of emergency. Next comes the "first flag," an ornately dressed Indian carrying a token tribe flag. Closest to the "Big Chief" is the "Wildman" who usually carries a symbolic weapon. Finally, there is the "Big Chief."  The "Big Chief" decides where to go and which tribes to meet (or ignore).  The entire group is followed by percussionists and revelers.

During the march, the Indians dance and sing traditional songs particular to their tribe.  They use hodgepodge languages loosely based on different African dialects. The "Big Chief" decides where the group will parade; the parade route is different each time.  When two tribes come across each other, they either pass by or meet for a symbolic fight.  Each tribe lines up and the "Big Chiefs" taunt each other about their suits and their tribes.  The drum beats of the two tribes intertwine, and the face off is complete.  Both tribes continue on their way.

Violence 
In the early days of the Indians, Mardi Gras was a day of both reveling and bloodshed.   "Masking" and parading was a time to settle grudges. This part of Mardi Gras Indian history is immortalized in James Sugar Boy Crawford's song, "Jock O Mo" (better known and often covered as "Iko Iko"), based on their taunting chants. However, in the late 1960s, Allison Montana, "Chief of Chiefs", fought to end violence between the Mardi Gras Indian Tribes. He said, "I was going to make them stop fighting with the gun and the knife and start fighting with the needle and thread." Today, the Mardi Gras Indians are not plagued by violence; instead, they base their fights over the "prettiness" of their suits.

Tribes of the Mardi Gras Indian Nation

Similar pan-American cultural practices

Second Line Parades - New Orleans and Cuba
Ruberos groups – Cuba
Escolas de Samba, Capoeira – Brazil
Rara – Haiti
19th Century Jametta Carnival – Trinidad
Jokonnu – West Indies
Sociedad de las Congas – Panama
L'agya – Martinique

In popular culture
 The HBO series Treme features one tribe of Mardi Gras Indians, the Guardians of the Flame, in one of the major plot lines weaving through the series, featuring preparations, the parades, as well as strained relationships with the police department.
 The song "Iko Iko" mentions two Mardi Gras Indian tribes.
 Beyoncé's 2016 visual album Lemonade showcases a Mardi Gras Indian circling a dining table, paying homage to the New Orleans culture.
 In the Freeform series Cloak & Dagger, based on the eponymous Marvel Comics characters, Tyrone Johnson's father and brother were Mardi Gras Indians prior to the events of the show. When Tyrone discovers his signature cloak it is revealed his brother was working on it while training to be a spyboy.

References

Further reading

External links 

 Big Chief Demond Melancon
 Bette Midler with Mardi Gras Indian Show
 Mardi Gras Indian Entertainment
 St. Joseph's Night in New Orleans: Out After Dark with the Wild Indians
 Mardi Gras Indian Influence on the Music of New Orleans
 "Big Chief Kevin Goodman and Mardi Gras Indian tribal history", Austin Chronicle
 Backstreet Cultural Museum
 Matthew Hinton, "Gallery: 7th Ward Mardi Gras Indians on Fat Tuesday 2010", The New Orleans Times-Picayune, February 16, 2010
 Clayton Cubitt's photographs and videos of Mardis Gras Indians posted to tumblr 
 Mardi Gras Indians – “Battling” on St. Josephs Night PBS
 Gallery of St. Joseph's Day 2016 Parade

African-American culture
Cultural appropriation
Ethnic and racial stereotypes
Stereotypes of Native American people
Mardi Gras in New Orleans